Bucculatrix mirnae is a moth in the family Bucculatricidae. It is found in the Azapa Valley in northern Chile. The species was first described in 2012 by Héctor Vargas and Gilson R.P. Moreira.

The forewings are covered with light reddish-brown scales. The hindwings are creamy white.

The larvae feed on Baccharis salicifolia. They mine the leaves of their host plant. Older larvae feed externally, skeletonizing the leaves. Pupation takes place in a cocoon, mostly spun on either twigs or dry leaves of the host plant.

Etymology
The species is named in honour of Professor Doctor Mirna Martins Casagrande.

References

External links

Bucculatricidae
Moths described in 2012
Endemic fauna of Chile
Moths of South America